Tai Lam or Tai Lam Chung is an area of Tuen Mun District, in the New Territories of Hong Kong.

Village
Tai Lam Chung Tsuen is a recognized village under the New Territories Small House Policy. It is one of the 36 villages represented within the Tuen Mun Rural Committee.

Tai Lam Chung is a multi-clan Hakka area historically inhabited by the Wu in Wu Uk, the Wong in Wong Uk and the Lee branching out from Lee Uk Tsuen of So Kwun Wat. Wu Uk and Wong Uk are both part of Tai Lam Chung Tsuen.

At the time of the 1911 census, the population of Tai Lam was 61. The number of males was 26.

Features
A Tin Hau Temple is located in Tai Lam Kok. Built in 1924, it underwent a major renovation in 1955. It was then demolished and reconstructed on the same site in 2006–2007.

Education
Tai Lam Chung is in Primary One Admission (POA) School Net 71. Within the school net are multiple aided schools (operated independently but funded with government money); no government schools are in the school net.

See also
 Maritime Services Training Institute
 Tai Lam Centre for Women
 Tai Lam Chung Reservoir
 Tai Lam Country Park
 Tuen Mun Road
 Yuen Tsuen Ancient Trail

References

External links

 Delineation of area of existing village Tai Lam Chung (Tuen Mun) for election of resident representative (2019 to 2022)
 Antiquities Advisory Board. Picture of Tin Hau Temple, Tai Lam Kok